The fictional universe of The Witcher Saga was created by Polish writer Andrzej Sapkowski. The following is a list of notable characters from the series of book series and its adaptations.

Overview
 A dark grey cell indicates that the character did not appear or that the character's presence has yet to be announced.
 A  indicates a role as a younger version of character portrayed by another actor.
 A  indicates an uncredited role.
 A  indicates a photographic role.
 A  indicates a cameo role.
 A  indicates a voice-only role.
 An  indicates an appearance through archival footage or stills.
 An  indicates the actor was part of the main cast for the season.

Main characters

Geralt of Rivia

Geralt of Rivia, known also as White Wolf (Old Speech: Gwynnbleid) or the "Butcher of Blaviken", is a witcher and the protagonist of the Witcher series and its adaptations. He has been described as a character embodying "the neo-liberal anti-politics" spirit of the Polish popular culture of the 1990s.

He is linked to Ciri by destiny, this being the central plot of the book series.

In the TV series, Geralt is portrayed by Henry Cavill.

Ciri of Cintra

Cirilla Fiona Elen Riannon, known as Ciri, the Lady of Time and Space and princess of Cintra, is one of the main characters of the Witcher saga, around whom much of the plot is centered. She is the lion cub of Cintra, daughter of Pavetta and Duny (also known as the Urcheon of Erlenwald) and granddaughter of Queen Calanthe. She is also Geralt's destiny and adopted daughter. Ciri is a descendant of Lara Dorren and has the Elder blood which gives her access to powers that allow her to cross space and time.

Ciri was trained under the watchful eyes of Geralt, Coën, Vesemir, Lambert, Eskel, and Triss while at Kaer Morhen and became talented with a sword. Later, she trained as a sorceress while living with Yennefer at Ellander. After the Thanedd coup, Ciri became separated from Geralt, created an unstable portal, and going through it found herself in the Korath desert. After her time in the desert, she joined a gang called the Rats, but then got herself captured by a bounty hunter named Leo Bonhart and was forced to fight in an arena. She later escaped and fled to the world of Aen Elle. During her time with the Aen Elle, she was going to be forced to procreate with the King, although she was able to avoid this. She later escaped from that world and after traveling through time was reunited with Geralt and Yen. She travelled with them for a few months before their untimely deaths. Her sword named Zireael is a 200 year old gwyhyr, a very expensive and precious sword regarded as the best in the world, forged by the gnomes of Tir Tochair. It was given to her as a gift by Esterhazy, the armorer and swordsmith in the town of Fano.

At the end of the books, after Geralt and Yennefer's deaths, Ciri finds herself in the world of Camelot where she meets young Galahad, one of King Arthur's knights, with whom she supposedly falls in love.

In the TV series, Ciri is portrayed by Freya Allan.

Yennefer of Vengerberg

Sorceress Yennefer of Vengerberg (nicknamed Yen or Yenna) first appeared in the collection of short stories, The Last Wish, featuring in both "The Last Wish" short story and "The Voice of Reason" frame story. She went on to appear in numerous other Witcher stories and is one of the main characters of the Witcher saga.

Yennefer is described as possessive. She becomes one of Geralt's lovers although their relationship is difficult and full of drama. Both Geralt and Yennefer are sterile, which adds another level of tragedy to the mix. Yennefer has a hard time accepting the fact and tries various methods of restoring her fertility. Yennefer ends up becoming a mother to Ciri while teaching her and watching over her while she was at Ellander.

Yennefer was born on  Beltane in the year 1173. She lived in the capital city of Aedirn, Vengerberg. She is one of the most powerful mages on the continent and is surpassed by only a handful. She is the youngest member of the Council of Sorcerers and later she became a member of the Lodge of Sorceresses. During the Battle of Sodden Hill she was blinded by Fringilla Vigo, a Nilfgaardian sorceress. Her sight was magically restored.

Yennefer was famous for her beauty, even though during the events of The Swallow's Tower, she was 94 years old. She always dressed in black and white clothing. She used lilac and gooseberry perfumes. She had violet eyes and raven black hair. Before becoming a sorceress, she was a hunchback, but had her deformities fixed by Tissaia de Vries while being an apprentice although Geralt is able to see the subtle clues that let him figure out the truth.

At the end of the books, Yennefer ends up dying while trying to heal Geralt, after losing all her energy.

In the TV series, Yennefer is portrayed by Anya Chalotra.

Supporting characters

Triss Merigold

Triss Merigold took care of Ciri for some time and is like an older sister to her. She was a member of the Lodge of Sorceresses. Triss is in love with Geralt.

The image of Triss Merigold from The Witcher 2: Assassins of Kings featured as cover girl in the Polish edition of Playboy in May 2011. She also appeared in a live model calendar for the game in Russia.

In the TV series, Triss Merigold is portrayed by Anna Shaffer.

Dandelion (Jaskier)
Julian Alfred Pankratz, Viscount of Lettenhove, commonly known as Dandelion is a poet, minstrel, bard, and Geralt's best friend. The Polish word  actually refers to the buttercup flower (Ranunculus). Some of his more famous ballads were about the relationship between Geralt and Yennefer. By the time of the saga, Dandelion was already in his 40s. However, it was said that he looked like he was in his 30s (“You are almost 40, you look 30, you imagine you’re 20, and you act like you're 10” as noted by Dijkstra); he was often mistaken for an elf. Dandelion accompanies Geralt in many of the short stories and ends up joining Geralt's hansa while searching for Ciri but left it before the assault on Stygga. Dandelion makes Geralt promise he would return with Ciri at Touissant where Dandelion lives. He would later rejoin Geralt and witness his and Yennefer's death at Rivia.

In the TV series, Jaskier is portrayed by Joey Batey.

King Foltest
King Foltest is the king of Temeria. He is involved in an incestuous affair with his sister that produced a daughter, although both the mother and child die in childbirth. They are buried in the family crypt beneath the family castle. However, five years later the situation and magic of the fantasy setting causes the daughter to become an undead beast called a Striga that kills villagers and forces the royal family of Temeria to abandon their castle and let it fall in to ruins. King Foltest forbids anyone to destroy the Striga and eventually hires Geralt to lift the curse of the daughter he dearly loves. Geralt is successful, and the girl returns to life as a 15 year old. However, she is uneducated and must be taught to speak and behave as a person.

In the TV series, King Foltest is portrayed by Shaun Dooley.

Milva
Maria Barring (known as Milva) is a talented female archer who was one of the few non dryads who was tolerated in Brokilon. After guiding the remains of the beaten Scoia'tael commandos during the second war she joined Geralt's quest to find Ciri. She would later reveal herself to be pregnant and would struggle between choosing an abortion or keeping the child. In the end she would later miscarry after being wounded during the Battle for the Bridge on the Yaruga. During the hansa's stay at Toussaint she struck up a relationship with a baron. She would later perish providing covering fire for the rest of the hansa during the assault on Stygga.

In the TV series, she will soon be portrayed by Meng'er Zhang

Cahir Mawr Dyffryn aep Ceallach
Cahir Mawr Dyffryn aep Ceallach (known as Cahir) was an intelligence officer in the Nilfgaardian army who would later join Geralt's hansa. Cahir was from Vicovaro and had five siblings and would end up falling in love with Ciri after he saved her during the attack on Cintra. However, Cahir was supposed to capture Ciri and bring her back to Emhyr, but she fled and he was forced to come back empty handed which lead to him being thrown into prison. He would have another chance to redeem himself during the coup at Thaned, but would once again fail. He would later end up joining the hansa as he wanted to protect and save Ciri. Due to him being a Nilfgaardian and more specifically the black knight who haunted Ciri's dreams, Geralt would have a hard time trusting him, but this would later change. Cahir ended up perishing in a duel against Leo Bonhart during the assault on Stygga in an attempt to buy some time for Ciri and Angoulême.

In the TV series, Cahir is portrayed by Eamon Farren.

Emiel Regis Rohellec Terzieff-Godefroy
Emiel Regis Rohellec Terzieff-Godefroy (known as Regis) was a higher vampire and a member of Geralt's hansa. He was well over 400 years old by the time of the books. Regis would later join the party after rescuing Geralt and Dandelion. However, due to him being a vampire, Geralt was reluctant to let him join; however, the rest of the members had an easier time with it. Regis was often fond of telling others how wrong they were about their knowledge of vampires and would enjoy having intellectual conversations with the other members of the group. Unlike other vampires, Regis did not drink blood due to his addiction to it when younger. During the hansa's stay at Toussaint, he developed a relationship with a succubus. Regis was very resistant to both physical damage and temperature; he could regenerate even if cut into pieces. Unfortunately for him, it did not help him during the fight with Vilgefortz, who melted him into a column with a powerful spell.

Angoulême
Angoulême was a fair hair girl who resembled Ciri. She was from a rich Cintran family but would later renounce her family and join a gang called the Nightingales. She would later end up joining Geralt's hansa after getting captured and becoming a crown witness in the investigation of the Nightingales. Geralt would later demand her release if he was to kill the Nightingales and because of this she would end up joining his hansa in return for what he did for her. Angoulême was quite fond of swearing and dreamed of opening up a bordello. Angoulême would later perish during the assault on Stygga. She died from blood loss from a wound she received while protecting Ciri.

Philippa Eilhart
Philippa Eilhart was King Vizimir's advisor and remained in Redania's court after his assassination, which was something that she herself arranged. Philippa was a very powerful sorceress and was one of the few to have the ability to polymorph. She was a close ally to Dijkstra and would occasionally sleep with him. She is bisexual. Eilhart was a member of the Chapter on the Conclave and was the leader of the Thanedd coup and the founder of the Lodge of Sorceresses. Philippa would arrange the coup in an attempt to get rid of the pro Nilfgaardian mages and strike first; however, her plans would backfire as the conclave would end up collapsing leaving the North weakened. Philippa along with the rest of the Lodge (besides Yennefer) attempted to use Ciri as a political tool to create a state run by mages; however, in the end her plans failed. It is stated in the final book that Philippa was eventually tortured and killed by witch hunters and later became known as Saint Philippa. In the games, however, she survived. 

In the TV series, Philippa Eilhart is portrayed by Cassie Clare.

Dijkstra
Sigismund Dijkstra was the spymaster in Vizimir's court. He considered himself to be close friends with Philippa and was in love with her. Dijkstra would later help Philippa in the coup at Thanedd but became crippled after Geralt would snap his leg. Dijkstra was considered to be a tall man and didn't look like a typical spymaster. He would later end up becoming one of the key reasons why the North won the second war against Nilfgaard as he managed to secure aid from Kovir which allowed him to get mercenaries and supplies for the Northern armies, however, due to being a commoner and not a noble the leaders of the North would look down upon him. At the end of the novels he was forced to flee Redania and the North after Philippa tried to have him killed when she thought that he was getting close to finding out what happen to Vizimir.

In the TV series, Dijkstra is portrayed by Graham McTavish.

Vilgefortz
Vilgefortz of Roggeveen was a member of the Chapter of the Conclave and was a very powerful sorcerer. Along with being one of the most powerful mages in the world of the Witcher, he also happened to be one of the greatest fighters. Vilgefrortz displayed his skills when he beat and crippled Geralt in a duel at Thanedd. Vilgefortz was not a typical mage, as he decided to become one after he was well into an adulthood and was already an experienced mercenary. Also, unlike the majority of sorcerers who tended to freeze their ages when they were older so they look distinguished, he happened to look like a man in his 30s and was quite handsome. He also happen to be one of the rare offspring of a mage as most of them are sterile. During the first war with Nilfgaard Vilgefortz proved to be crucial for the North winning as he led the mages during the battle of Sodden hill. He along with his fellow mages were considered heroes in the North, but he would later end up switching sides and working with Emhyr in an attempt to get his hands on Ciri so he could have the elder blood from the child he planned to put in her. Vilgefortz was later killed during the assault on Stygga at the hands of Geralt though it was no easy task as he seriously wounded Yen and Geralt and (literally) melted Regis.

In the TV series, Vilgefortz is portrayed by Mahesh Jadu.

Leo Bonhart
Leo was one of the most famous bounty hunters on the continent during the events of the books. He was nearly seven feet tall, although he was described as being ghoulish and had fish-like eyes. Bonhart was an incredibly dangerous sword fighter and he easily defeated the gang of Rats and also claimed to have killed three Witchers and had their medallions as proof, though Yennefer questioned if he actually defeated them in a sword duel or if he killed them through other means. Leo was hired by Steffan Skellan to kill Ciri, though he ended up capturing her and would use her as a pit fighter. Ciri would later escape him and he would unsuccessfully give chase. He joined an alliance with Vilgefortz and Steffan Skellan and would later end up killing Cahir during the assault on Stygga, but he himself was later killed in a duel against Ciri.

Eredin (King of the Wild Hunt)
Eredin is a figure that leads a horde of ghastly riders across the sky. In The Swallow's Tower, he and Avallac'h lure Ciri to the tower, which led to her imprisonment in the world belonging to Aen Elle. There, the duo tried to force her to beget a child with the king of the Aen Elle elves to harness her powers. Eredin ruined the plan by killing the king. Ciri managed to escape with the help of unicorns, but not before learning that elves have massacred humans on the Aen Elle world.

Mousesack
Mousesack (Ermion in The Witcher 3 video game) is a druid from Skellige Islands and a good friend of Geralt. He helps raise Ciri before the Slaughter of Cintra.

In the TV series, Mousesack is portrayed by Adam Levy.

Queen Calanthe
Calanthe is the queen of Cintra and a grandmother of Ciri. She dies during the Slaughter of Cintra.

In the TV series, Queen Calanthe is portrayed by Jodhi May.

Yarpen Zigrin 
Yarpen Zigrin dwarf who aids Geralt many times from the hunting down of a golden dragon to aiding him on the trail. 

In the TV series, Zigrin is played by Jeremy Crawford.

Notes

References

Further reading

External links
  Anika Radzka, Kinga Kwaterska,  Teoretyczne mądrości. PRZESTRZEŃ W FANTASY - TEZY DO DYSKUSJI. WIEDŹMINLAND, CZYLI TŁO DLA BOHATERÓW  
  Two maps of the Wiedźmnland
  A map from the Czech translation

Lists of fantasy characters
Lists of fantasy television characters
Lists of film characters
Lists of literary characters
Lists of video game characters
Characters